40 Trips Around the Sun is a greatest hits album by American rock band Toto, released on February 9, 2018. The album was released in commemoration of the 40th anniversary of Toto's self-titled debut album (1978).

40 Trips Around the Sun contains 14 tracks from 1978 to 1993, and three previously unreleased recordings ("Spanish Sea", "Alone" and "Struck by Lightning"). "Spanish Sea" was recorded during the sessions for Isolation (1984), and was re-written with a new chorus. Steve Lukather said of the song: "Thanks to modern tech we were able to play once again with not only our 20 something selves but with our dear brothers Jeff and Mike Porcaro reminding us just how deep their groove was. Bittersweet... Many stories, laughs and a few tears on this one". "Alone" is a newly written song by Toto members David Paich, Steve Lukather, Steve Porcaro and Joseph Williams, while "Struck by Lightning" was previously unreleased.

Track listing

Personnel
"Alone"
Steve Lukather: guitars, bass, backing vocals
David Paich: piano, keyboards
Steve Porcaro: synthesizers
Joseph Williams: lead and backing vocals, additional keyboards
Vinnie Colaiuta: drums
Lenny Castro: percussion

"Spanish Sea"
Jeff Porcaro: drums
Mike Porcaro: bass
Steve Lukather: guitars, backing vocals
David Paich: piano, keyboards, lead and backing vocals
Steve Porcaro: synthesizer, backing vocals
Joseph Williams: lead and backing vocals, additional keyboards
Lenny Castro: percussion
Mark T. Williams, Timothy B. Schmit: backing vocals

"Struck by Lightning"
Steve Lukather: guitars, bass
David Paich: keyboards, backing vocals
Steve Porcaro: Hammond organs
Joseph Williams: lead vocals, keyboards
Vinnie Colaiuta: drums
Martin Tillman: cello
Pat Knox, Lorraine Paich, Weston Wilson: backing vocals (lightning chant)

Singles

 "Alone" / "Hold the Line"
 "Spanish Sea"

Charts

References

Toto (band) albums
2018 greatest hits albums
Compilation albums published posthumously
Columbia Records compilation albums